AC/DC: Let There Be Rock is a 1980 concert film featuring the Australian hard rock band AC/DC, released theatrically in September 1980 (and AC/DC's native Australia on New Year's Eve, 1981) and on videotape the same year.

Overview 
AC/DC: Let There Be Rock  was filmed on 9 December 1979 at the Pavillon de Paris in Paris, France, and also contains interviews with members of the band, including lead vocalist Bon Scott, who died over two months after filming.

The concert film was re-released on a Blu-ray/DVD double pack along with a collector's tin, concert pictures, a souvenir guitar pick, and a 32-page booklet, or just as Blu-ray or DVD individual sets on 7 June 2011. Only 90,000 of the collectors tins were made, and each labeled with a number out of 90,000 on the base of the tin.

Though it shares a name with AC/DC's fourth studio album, Let There Be Rock, the movie also includes live versions of songs from T.N.T., Powerage, and Highway to Hell. The movie's poster and videotape package featured similar cover art to that used on the most-widely distributed editions of the Let There Be Rock album.

In 1997, an expanded audio recording of this concert was released on CD as Let There Be Rock: The Movie – Live in Paris, on discs 2-3 of the Bonfire box set. In addition to the 13 tracks included on the movie, the CD also contains a live version of "T.N.T.".

Track listing
"Live Wire" - 5:23 (1975)
"Shot Down in Flames" - 3:18 (1979)
"Hell Ain't a Bad Place to Be" - 3:54 (1977)
"Sin City" - 3:52 (1978)
"Walk All Over You" - 2:30 (1979)
"Bad Boy Boogie" - 11:08 (1977)
"The Jack" - 5:21 (1975)
"Highway to Hell" - 3:10 (1979)
"Girls Got Rhythm" - 3:09 (1979)
"High Voltage" - 5:27 (1975)
"Whole Lotta Rosie" - 4:41 (1977)
"Rocker" - 8:57 (1975)
"Let There Be Rock" - 7:17 (1977)

All songs composed by Angus Young, Malcolm Young, and Bon Scott.

Personnel
Bon Scott – lead vocals
Angus Young – lead guitar
Malcolm Young – rhythm guitar, backing vocals
Cliff Williams – bass, backing vocals
Phil Rudd – drums, percussion

Crew
Directors – Eric Dionysius
Producer – Eric Mistler
Cinematography – Jean-Francis Gondre
Film – Mariette Lévy-Novion
Executive Producer – Martine Cuisinier
Sound – Mike Scarfe (MHA Audio)
Special Effects – Terry Lee (lightning)
Visual Effects – Klaus Blasquiz (graphics) and Jacques Dimier (animation)

Reception
The film drew mixed reviews from critics. Variety wrote that it was notable for being "shot, for the most part, from above or on the stage – as opposed to upwards, in the pit in front of the stage, as is the case with so many rock concert films. This gives the hard rock audience which goes repeatedly to Led Zeppelin or Pink Floyd concert films a chance to see rock from a new angle ... Visually, lead guitarist Angus Young, in his short pants and schoolboy's uniform, proves to be one of the most original and theatrical rock performers to come by in years. His crazy, careening dances across the stage are, along with the photography, the only elements that separate this production from so many other rock films." Richard Harrington of The Washington Post echoed Variety'''s review, writing that the film "offers few insights into the workings of the band, but then its aim is as true as it is low. Mercifully avoiding superfluous crowd shots, directors Eric Dionysius and Eric Mistler have come up with some distinctive camera angles. Most of the film is shot high on the lip of the stage (only a foot or two from the band) or from a high moving dolly that provides a new performance perspective – rock from the top."

Stephen Holden of The New York Times wrote a negative review of the film, calling it "a dull, cheaply made concert film that should appeal only to diehard fans of the hugely popular Australian rock quintet." Holden described the band members' responses in the interview segments as "almost invariably so garbled – apparently by drunkenness – as to be virtually unintelligible." Ed Naha of the New York Post also disliked the film, writing: "AC/DC is one of the most exciting hard rock bands around, although you'd never know it from this movie. Basically, it's a 'let's set up, let's drink, let's play, let's play some more' flick that never really tells you much about the band except that they seem high a lot and have a hard time keeping their pants up onstage ... The moviegoer is truly lucky if more than one figure is in focus in any given scene. The much hyped 'Wall of Sound' in-theater stereo system should have been tagged 'Wall of Noise' instead. The music comes off loud and muddy and the vocals are reduced to indecipherable whines." Journalist Mark Putterford called the film "a double-edged sword: on the one hand the live footage is excellent, showing AC/DC at very near their best; on the other, the off stage interviews with each member are at best amateurish, at worst downright embarrassing."

"A big rock 'n' roll moment for me as a teenager was going to see AC/DC's Let There Be Rock movie," Dave Grohl told Q''. "That was the first time I heard music that made me want to break shit… After the first number in that movie, that was maybe the first moment in my life where I really felt like a punk. I just wanted to tear that movie theatre to shreds."

Certifications

References

External links

 AC/DC Let There Be Rock at the National Film and Sound Archive

Australian musical films
French musical films
1980 films
Warner Bros. films
AC/DC
1980s musical films
1980s English-language films
1980s French films